Putini  may refer to:

 Putini, a village near Răchitoasa, Romania
 Putini, Croatia, a village near Kanfanar in Istria